MT-TV is a British female rock band, formed of former members of Rockbitch.

Bassist Fuse and late drummer Jo also performed in the acoustic alternative rock band Syren, along with Erin Bennett.

Personnel
Krow (Julie Worland) : vocals, songwriter
Alex: lead guitar 
Brooke (Luci): guitar
Fuse (Amanda Smith-Skinner): bass
Nikki: keyboards
Jo (Joanne Heeley) (2 November 1972 – 11 January 2012) : drums
The Stereotypes: Bunny (Chloe), Erzulie, Kali: Backing vocals and stage show

Discography and videography
Live in France (CD mini-album) (2005)
Shevolution (DVD) (2006)
East/West (CD) (2008)
North/South (DVD) (2008)

External links
Official site 
Music Nation review 
Toledo City Paper: "MT-TV responds to criticism about its allegedly indecent Rally by the River performance"

All-female bands
English rock music groups